MENTHO or STARD3 N-terminal like protein (STARD3NL) is an integral membrane protein of unknown function. As the alternate name implies, MENTHO, short for "MLN64 N-terminal homologue", contains a region in its N-terminus similar to that found in STARD3, also known as MLN64, but lacks the StAR-related transfer domain (START) that characterizes all other proteins given the "STARD" (START domain-containing) name. The N-terminal domain is called a MENTAL (MLN64 N-terminal) domain.

Like MLN64, MENTHO is widely expressed in tissues of the body.  Within the cell, it localizes to the membranes of late endosomes and may interact there with MLN64.  It is suggested that in combination with MLN64, this protein helps regulate the flow of cholesterol through the endosomal pathway.

References

Further reading

External links
 

Integral membrane proteins